In political science, Duverger's law holds that single-ballot majoritarian elections with single-member districts (such as first past the post) tend to favor a two-party system. The discovery of this tendency is attributed to Maurice Duverger, a French sociologist who observed the effect and recorded it in several papers published in the 1950s and 1960s. In the course of further research, other political scientists began calling the effect a "law" or principle.

As a corollary to the law, Duverger also asserted that proportional representation favors multi-partyism, as does the plurality system with runoff elections.

Duverger's law draws from a model of causality from the electoral system to a party system. A proportional representation (PR) system creates electoral conditions that foster the development of many parties, whereas a plurality system marginalizes smaller political parties, generally resulting in a two-party system.

Most countries with plurality voting have representation in their legislatures by more than two parties. While the United States is very much a two-party system, the United Kingdom, Canada and India have consistently had multiparty parliaments. However, only the two dominant parties of their times have formed governments in the United Kingdom and Canada. Eric Dickson and Kenneth Scheve argue that there is a counter force to Duverger's law, that on the national level a plurality system encourages two parties, but in the individual constituencies supermajorities will lead to the vote fracturing. Steven R. Reed has shown Duverger's law to work in Japan and Italy.

In recent years the validity of this law has come under increasing quantitative scrutiny.

Mechanism
A two-party system often develops in a plurality voting system. In this system, voters have a single vote, which they can cast for a single candidate in their district, in which only one legislative seat is available. In plurality voting (also referred to as first past the post), in which the winner of the seat is determined purely by the candidate with the most votes, several characteristics can serve to discourage the development of third parties and reward the two major parties.

Duverger argued that there were two mechanisms whereby plurality voting systems lead to fewer major parties: (i) small parties are disincentivized to form because they have great difficulty winning seats or representation, and (ii) voters are wary of voting for a smaller party whose policies they actually favor because they do not want to "waste" their votes (on a party unlikely to win a plurality) and therefore tend to gravitate to one of two major parties that is more likely to achieve a plurality, win the election, and implement policy.

Because the first-past-the-post system gives only the (plurality) winner in each district a seat, a party that consistently comes in second or third in many or most districts will not gain any seats in the legislature, even if it receives a substantial minority of the vote. This puts geographically thinly spread parties at a significant disadvantage to geographically concentrated ones with the same overall level of public support. An example of this is the Liberal Democrats in the United Kingdom, whose proportion of seats in the legislature is significantly less than their proportion of the national vote. The Green Party of Canada is another example; the party received about 5% of the popular vote from 2004 to 2011 but had only won one seat (out of 308) in the House of Commons in the same span of time. Another example was seen in the 1992 U.S. presidential election, when Ross Perot's candidacy received zero electoral votes despite receiving 19% of the popular vote. Gerrymandering is sometimes used to try to collect a population of like-minded voters within a geographically cohesive district so that their votes are not "wasted", but tends to be controversial (because it can also be used for the opposite purpose). These disadvantages tend to suppress the ability of a third party to engage in the political process.

The second challenge to a third party is both statistical and tactical. Duverger presents the example of an election in which 100,000 moderate voters and 80,000 radical voters are to vote for candidates for a single seat or office. If two moderate parties ran candidates and one radical candidate ran (and every voter voted), the radical candidate would tend to win unless one of the moderate candidates gathered fewer than 20,000 votes. Appreciating this risk, moderate voters would be inclined to vote for the moderate candidate they deemed likely to gain more votes, with the goal of defeating the radical candidate. To win, then, either the two moderate parties must merge, or one moderate party must fail, as the voters gravitate to the two strongest parties. Duverger called this trend polarization.

A third party can enter the political arena in two approaches, one approach is by building local third party strongholds as seen successfully in Canada or UK, and the second approach is to displace one of the two major parties. For example, the political chaos in the United States immediately preceding the Civil War allowed the Republican Party to replace the Whig Party as the progressive half of the American political landscape. Loosely united on a platform of country-wide economic reform and federally funded industrialization, the decentralized Whig leadership failed to take a decisive stance on the slavery issue, effectively splitting the party along the Mason–Dixon line. Southern rural planters, initially attracted by the prospect of federal infrastructure and schools, aligned with the pro-slavery Democrats, while urban laborers and professionals in the northern states, threatened by the sudden shift in political and economic power and losing faith in the failing Whig candidates, flocked to the increasingly vocal anti-slavery Republican Party.

Elections with single-winner ranked voting show the effect of Duverger's law, as seen in Australia's House of Representatives.

In countries that use proportional representation (PR), a two-party system is less likely, especially in countries where the whole country forms a single constituency, as it does in Israel, along with low electoral thresholds to obtain office. Israel's electoral rules historically had an electoral threshold for a party to obtain a seat as low as one percent of the vote; the threshold is 3.25% as of 2014. Germany's threshold in its Bundestag is either 5% of the national party vote or three (directly elected) constituency representatives for a party to gain additional representation through proportional representation.  The number of votes received for a party determines the number of seats won, and new parties can thus develop an immediate electoral niche. Duverger identified that the use of PR would make a two-party system less likely. However, other systems do not guarantee new parties access to the system: Malta provides an example of a stable two-party system using the single transferable vote.

Counterexamples
Duverger did not regard this principle as absolute, suggesting instead that plurality would act to delay the emergence of new political forces and would accelerate the elimination of weakening ones, whereas proportional representation would have the opposite effect. The following examples are partly due to the effect of smaller parties that have the majority of their support concentrated in a small number of electorates rather than diluted across many electorates. William H. Riker, citing Douglas W. Rae, noted that strong regional parties can distort matters, leading to more than two parties receiving seats in the national legislature, even if there are only two parties competitive in any single district.

The following example seems counter to the law:
 In the Philippines since 1987, no party has been able to control the House of Representatives; although the party of the president usually has the plurality of seats, it still has to seek coalition partners to command a majority of seats. It may be relevant that the Philippines' governance structure changed repeatedly before 1987 and that the country has many distinct social groups. Also, 80% of the seats in the House of Representatives are elected via FPTP, while the senators are elected via plurality-at-large voting. The average number of candidates in the 2013 House of Representatives elections in every district is only 2.69.

There are also cases where the principle appears to have an effect, but weakly:
 In India, there are 38 political parties represented in the Parliament. Like the UK and Canada, India has a winner-takes-all system. Most of the Indian parties are allied with one of two larger electoral coalitions which makes the Indian system functionally somewhat like a two-party system.  In Droit constitutionnel et institutions politiques, Olivier Duhamel argues that these 30+ political parties elected in India and the over 25 percent of voting for parties outside the two main alliances shows that the "law according to which the first-past-the-post system tends to produce duopolies only applies in relatively homogeneous societies with a fairly centralized State.  Otherwise, the national party system faces competition from regional subsystems."
 In Canada, five parties are currently represented in the House of Commons, and the number has averaged between 4 and 5 since 1935. In recent decades, the Liberal Party of Canada, the Conservative Party of Canada, the New Democratic Party, the Bloc Québecois have frequently though not always won official party status. Canada has had more than two registered parties in the House of Commons since 1921, and at only three relatively brief periods in Canadian history have there been only three parties represented (1921–1935, 1958–1962, and 1980–1993). Only two parties (Liberals and Conservatives) have ever formed government, but the Progressive Conservative Party fell to fourth party status in 1993 and the Liberal Party of Canada fell to third party status in 2011. Canada has also had a long pattern of minority governments, which has reinforced the view of some that voting for third parties is a pragmatic as well as principled option, as minority governments must rely on smaller parties for their support. 
 In the United Kingdom, Labour became a third party to the Tory (later Conservative) and Whig (later Liberal) parties, gradually replacing the Liberals as one of the two main parties. The Liberals were the third party: followed by the SDP–Liberal Alliance, and later the Liberal Democrats, between the February 1974 and 2015 elections obtained 1–10% of seats forming a third party, albeit with significantly fewer seats. This share of seats is despite gathering around a fifth of votes consistently over the same time period.In the UK there is no president and thus no unifying election to force party mergers and regional two-party systems are formed. This is because Duverger's law says that the number of viable parties is one plus the number of seats in a constituency. In Scotland, Labour and the SNP were the two dominant parties (the Scottish Conservatives experienced a resurgence in the 2017 general election and Scottish Parliament elections), with the SNP replacing the Lib Dems in this role. In southwest England, the Lib Dems face off against the Conservatives; Labour voters may vote for the Lib Dems to prevent a Conservative from winning. Caroline Lucas of the Green Party has held a seat since 2010. Other parties have won seats , but they are either elected outside England, where the British FPTP system is used in parallel to the Welsh and Scottish proportional-representation multiparty democracy or through by-elections (such as the Respect Coalition). Northern Ireland has an entirely separate political system in which neither Labour nor the Liberal Democrats stand candidates; the Conservatives occasionally do but are not competitive.

Riker pointed to Canada's regional politics, as well as the U.S. presidential election of 1860, as examples of often temporary regional instability that occurs from time-to-time in otherwise stable two-party systems. While the multiparty system can be seen in the House of Commons of Canada, the highly regionalized parties are evident in the province-by-province examination. Unlike in the United States, where the two major parties are organized and unified at the federal, state and local levels, Canada's federal and provincial parties generally operate as separate organizations.

Mathematical proof 
Duverger's law can be proven mathematically at the limit when the number of voters approaches infinity for one single-winner district and where the probability distribution of votes is known (perfect information).

Converse
Two-party politics may emerge in systems that do not use the plurality vote, especially in countries using systems that do not fully incorporate proportional representation. For instance, Malta has a single transferable vote (STV) system and apparently stable two-party politics.

Some systems are even more likely to lead to a two-party outcome: for example, elections in Gibraltar use a partial block vote system (which is classified as majoritarian) in a single constituency, so the third most popular party is unlikely to win any seats.

In recent years some researchers have modified Duverger's law by suggesting that causal influence between electoral and party systems might be bidirectional or in either direction.

It has been shown that changes from a plurality system to a proportional system are typically preceded by the emergence of more than two effective parties, and increases in the effective number of parties happens not in the short-term, but in the mid-to-long term.

See also

References

External links
 Dunleavy, Patrick, Duverger’s Law is a dead parrot. Outside the USA, first-past-the-post voting has no tendency at all to produce two party politics

Voting theory